Credit Bank of Albania (CBA) is a private commercial bank headquartered in Tirana, Albania. It launched operations in March 2003. The bank's founders and shareholders are Kuwaiti entrepreneurs Jassim al-Kharafi, Nasser al-Kharafi and Fauzi al-Kharafi.
CBA's core lending activity is focused on corporate clients but it also offers traditional banking products and services, such as checking accounts, saving accounts, time deposits and lending services.

References

Banks of Albania